Base FX is a visual effects and animation company with production studios in Beijing, Kuala Lumpur, Wuxi and Xiamen, and an office in Los Angeles. The company was founded in 2006 and has completed more than 150 films.

Base FX specializes in high-end creature and character animation, fluid and dynamic effects, and photo-real 3D matte painting and set extensions, providing services to Hollywood film companies, producers and top directors in China.

History
Base FX was founded by CEO Bremble and a team of 12 artists and CG instructors who had previously worked on one of Bremble's films, the 2005 picture Deep Rescue.  The company quickly began to grow, securing clients in China and Hollywood, and building a talented team of artists.

In 2010, Christopher Bremble was awarded an Emmy for Outstanding Special Visual Effects in a Movie or Mini-Series for the company's work on HBO's epic war saga The Pacific. The company was awarded its second Emmy in 2011 for its work on HBO's Boardwalk Empire, an American period crime drama television series, and a third one in 2014 for its work on Starz's pirate adventure series "Black Sails".

In May, 2012, Base signed a Strategic Alliance Agreement with Lucasfilm and Industrial Light & Magic (ILM). At the Beijing Film Festival on April 18, 2013, the two companies signed an expanded co-operation deal that secures the exclusive use of the Beijing-based studio’s services for all ILM’s Hollywood films.

In 2012, Base stationed in the industrial park in Wuxi, China, and will work on animation films for clients.

In 2014, Base opened its third production studio in Xiamen, China, to make visual effects for Hollywood films.

On December 29, 2014, Base FX signed strategic cooperation agreements with China Fortune Land Development Co., Ltd. (CFLD) and will tenant in Dachang Film and Media Industrial Park to build a high-end VFX training base.

As of 2014, Base FX has finished 120 projects with more than 10,000 visual effects shots.

On 20 April 2015, Base FX jointly founded China Post Production Alliance (CPPA) at the 5th Beijing International Film Festival to promote and enhance the development of visual effects in China.

In August 2018, Base FX's production arm Base Pictures, working with Meridian Entertainment, began production on the action disaster film Skyfire. Directed by Simon West, the film stars Hannah Quinlivan, Wang Xueqi, and Shawn Dou and is scheduled to be released on December 12, 2019. It is produced by Chris Bremble, Jennifer Dong, and Jib Polhemus.

Base FX's very first overseas production facility was set to open in mid-June of 2018 in Bangsar South complex in Kuala Lumpur, Malaysia. The full-service studio will be staffed by over 200 staff.

In 2020, Base FX hired Shanghai-based digital agency Metric Design Studio to redesign their website.

Credits

References

External links
Official Website of Base FX
Weibo page of Base FX
Facebook page of Base FX
LinkedIn page of Base FX
A video about life at Base FX

Visual effects companies
American animation studios
Mass media companies established in 2006
Companies based in Los Angeles
Chinese animation studios